is a former Japanese football player. He played for Japan national team. His brother Hiroaki Matsuyama is also former footballer.

Club career
Matsuyama was born in Kyoto on July 31, 1966. After graduating from Waseda University, he joined Furukawa Electric in 1989. He moved to Matsushita Electric (later Gamba Osaka) in 1991. In 1997, he moved to his local club Kyoto Purple Sanga. He retired end of 1997 season.

National team career
In April 1987, when Matsuyama was a Waseda University student, he was selected Japan national team for 1988 Summer Olympics qualification. At this qualification, on April 8, he debuted against Indonesia. He played 10 games and scored 4 goals for Japan until 1989.

Club statistics

National team statistics

References

External links

Japan National Football Team Database

1966 births
Living people
Waseda University alumni
Association football people from Kyoto Prefecture
Japanese footballers
Japan international footballers
Japan Soccer League players
J1 League players
JEF United Chiba players
Gamba Osaka players
Kyoto Sanga FC players
1988 AFC Asian Cup players
Footballers at the 1990 Asian Games
Association football midfielders
Asian Games competitors for Japan